Saya Chone (1866–1917) was a prominent Burmese painter based in Mandalay. He served as a royal court painter during the reign of King Thibaw Min, the last monarch of the Konbaung dynasty. After the British annexation of Upper Burma in 1886, he created many works depicting Burmese palace life.

Gallery

See also
Burmese art

References

1866 births
1917 deaths
Burmese artists
19th-century painters
20th-century Burmese painters